Alejandro Abraham Guerra Morales (born 9 July 1985) is a Venezuelan former professional footballer who played as an attacking midfielder.

Club career

Caracas
Born in Caracas, Guerra started his senior career at hometown club Caracas FC, making his senior debut in 2003 and appearing in four matches during the campaign. He scored his first professional goal on 21 September 2003, in a 6–0 routing of Monagas.

In 2004 Guerra was loaned to Primera B Nacional club Juventud Antoniana, for one year. After failing to make a single appearance at the club, he returned to Caracas in the following year and subsequently established himself as a starter. He scored his first goal in the Copa Libertadores on 22 February 2007, netting the game's only in a home success over L.D.U. Quito.

On 1 July 2010, Guerra announced his departure from the club after having "economical disputes with the club's board".

Deportivo Anzoátegui
On 20 July 2010, Guerra signed a one-year contract with fellow top tier club Deportivo Anzoátegui. He made his debut for the club on 8 August, starting and scoring his team's second in a 2–2 home draw against Deportivo Petare.

Guerra scored his first professional hat-trick on 3 April 2011, in a 4–2 away win against Estudiantes de Mérida. He repeated the feat late in the month, in a 10–0 home thrashing of Atlético Venezuela. He finished his first and only season at the club with 16 goals, also scoring once in 2011 Copa Sudamericana.

Mineros de Guayana
In July 2011 Guerra joined Mineros de Guayana. He scored his first goals for the club on 25 September 2011, netting a brace in a 2–1 home win against Llaneros de Guanare.

Guerra was a regular starter for Mineros in the following campaigns, as his side finished second in 2013–14. He also played a key role in 2012 Copa Sudamericana, scoring three goals in only four games as his side became the first Venezuelan club to win an away match in the competition.

Atlético Nacional
On 30 June 2014 Guerra moved abroad for the first time in his career, after agreeing to a one-year loan deal at Atlético Nacional. On 5 July of the following year he was bought outright, with Mineros retaining 30% of his federative rights.

Guerra featured regularly in the following seasons, and was an important unit in the club's Libertadores winning campaign by playing in 13 matches and scoring three goals; two of them, in a 4–2 home win against Huracán on 3 May 2016, granted their qualification to the quarterfinals. By winning the tournament, he became the first Venezuelan to lift the trophy.

Palmeiras
On 27 December 2016, Brazilian club Palmeiras announced Guerra signed a three-year contract, starting in January 2017.  With help from sponsors Crefisa, the club paid US$ 3,7 million for the player.

Bahia (loan)
On 5 July 2019, Palmeiras reached an agreement for Alejandro Guerra to join Bahia on loan until the end of the season.

International career
After representing Venezuela at under-20 level in 2005 South American U-20 Championship, Guerra made his debut for the main squad on 5 May 2006, coming on as a second half substitute for Jorge Rojas in a 0–1 loss against Mexico at the Rose Bowl in Pasadena, California. He scored his first full international goal the following 14 January, netting the first in a 2–0 friendly win against Sweden.

Guerra was also called up for 2007 and 2015 Copa América, aside from Copa América Centenario. He made his debut in the competition on 26 June 2007 in a 1–0 win against Bolivia.

Career statistics

Club

International

International goals
Scores and results list the Venezuela's goal tally first.

|-
| 1. || 14 January 2007 || José Pachencho Romero, Maracaibo, Venezuela ||  || align=center | 1–0 || align=center | 2–0 || Friendly
|-
| 2. || 8 September 2007 || Polideportivo Cachamay, Puerto Ordaz, Venezuela ||  || align=center | 3–2 || align=center | 3–2 || Friendly
|-
| 3. || 20 November 2007 || Pueblo Nuevo, San Cristóbal, Venezuela ||  || align=center | 3–3 || align=center | 5–3 || 2010 FIFA World Cup qualification
|-
| 4. || 11 June 2011 || Sam Boyd Stadium, Las Vegas, United States ||  || align=center | 1–0 || align=center | 3–0 || Friendly
|}

Honours

Club
Caracas
Venezuelan Primera División: 2003–04, 2005–06, 2006–07, 2008–09, 2009–10 
Copa Venezuela: 2009

Mineros de Guayana
Copa Venezuela: 2011

Atlético Nacional
Categoría Primera A: 2014–I, 2015–II
Copa Colombia: 2016
Superliga Colombiana: 2016
Copa Libertadores: 2016

Palmeiras
Campeonato Brasileiro Série A: 2018

Individual
Copa Libertadores Best Player: 2016

References

External links

1985 births
Living people
Footballers from Caracas
Venezuelan footballers
Association football midfielders
Venezuelan Primera División players
Caracas FC players
Deportivo Anzoátegui players
A.C.C.D. Mineros de Guayana players
Categoría Primera A players
Atlético Nacional footballers
Campeonato Brasileiro Série A players
Sociedade Esportiva Palmeiras players
Esporte Clube Bahia players
2007 Copa América players
2015 Copa América players
Copa Libertadores-winning players
Copa América Centenario players
Venezuela international footballers
Venezuela under-20 international footballers
Venezuelan expatriate footballers
Venezuelan expatriate sportspeople in Colombia
Venezuelan expatriate sportspeople in Brazil
Expatriate footballers in Colombia
Expatriate footballers in Brazil